Lee Eric Williams (born October 15, 1962 in Fort Lauderdale, Florida) is a former American football defensive end and defensive tackle in the National Football League. He was drafted by the San Diego Chargers sixth overall in the 1984 NFL Supplemental Draft of USFL and CFL Players. He played college football at Bethune-Cookman.

Early years
Williams attended Stranahan High School. He accepted a football scholarship from Bethune–Cookman University.

Professional career
Williams was selected by the Tampa Bay Bandits in the 1984 USFL Territorial Draft. He was traded to the Los Angeles Express, where he played the 1984 USFL season.

He was also selected by the San Diego Chargers sixth overall in the 1984 NFL Supplemental Draft of USFL and CFL Players. He joined the Chargers to play the 1984 NFL season.

A two-time Pro Bowl selection with the Chargers, Williams also played for the Houston Oilers.

References

1962 births
Living people
American football defensive ends
American football defensive tackles
Bethune–Cookman Wildcats football players
Los Angeles Express players
San Diego Chargers players
Houston Oilers players
American Conference Pro Bowl players